Avening is a village and civil parish in the Cotswold district of Gloucestershire, England, about  north of Tetbury.   According to the 2001 census it had a population of 1,094, decreasing to 1,031 at the 2011 census. Nearby is Gatcombe Park, the home of the Princess Royal.


History
During the Second World War, Avening lay on the GHQ Line. Extensive anti-tank ditches were constructed to the south and southeast, and were overlooked by a number of pillboxes. The defences were constructed as a part of British anti-invasion preparations.

Governance
Avening has a Parish Council consisting of nine elected or co-opted members.

An electoral ward in the same name exists. This ward stretches from Avening in the west to Long Newnton in the south east. The total population of this ward taken at the 2011 census was 1,930.

Religious sites

The Anglican Church of the Holy Cross was built in late 11th century. It is a grade I listed building.

Famous residents
Michael Powell (1905–1990). Film director, producer, screenwriter, actor. Buried in Holy Cross Church. The gravestone was designed by his son Columba who appeared in some of his films .
Pamela Brown (1917–1975). Enigmatic RADA trained actor, Pamela spent her last days with Michael Powell at the cottage in Avening which they both loved. Also buried in Holy Cross Church
Lindsey Merrison (born 1959). Anglo-burmese film director and producer has a cottage.[]
Arthur Lee, 1st Viscount Lee of Fareham and Lady Lee lived at Old Quarries, a grade II listed building.
The now disbanded Clogging dance group Roughshod Appalachian Cloggers and their band The Cotswold Mountain Boys originated from Avening. They were well known around the local area and in the UK folk festival circuit. They appeared on The Michael Barrymore show in 1993 .
John Sirgood (1822–1885). Christian fundamentalist lay preacher, and founder of the Society of Dependants was born in Avening.
Caroline Playne (1857-1948), historian and anti-war activist, was born in Avening.

Related place names
Avening is also the name of a rural community immediately south of Creemore, Ontario, Canada, on the Mad River. One of its pioneers was Frederick C. Thornbury, who built a grist mill and a sawmill in the Ontario community in 1860, and named the settlement "after his native place in England".

References

Notes

General references

External links

 Avening Parish Council
 
 Stroud Voices (Avening filter) - oral history site

Villages in Gloucestershire
Cotswold District